The nutmeg (Hadula trifolii or Anarta trifolii), also known as the clover cutworm, is a moth of the family Noctuidae.

Distribution
It is found in the Western Palearctic (western Europe, Tunisia, Iran), Niger, and Quebec in North America. In the north of its European range it is a summer migrant, not being able to survive the cold winters.

Description
This is a small to medium (wingspan 33–39 mm) species with cryptically coloured forewings, varying from light to dark brown, sometimes with a reddish tinge. The most characteristic feature is a distinctively "W"-shaped, white subterminal line. This feature is seen on some other noctuids, but usually much larger species. The hindwings are grey or buff, darker towards the termen, and marked with dark veins.

Description in Seitz
Forewing grey, dark speckled:costa black-spotted: claviform stigma small: orbicular round, pale, sometimes whitish: reniform large, the lower lobe dark grey, all three finely black-edged; veins towards termen finely black; hindwing
dull whitish, with abroad border and the veins fuscous. —  saucia Esp.  is the form showing a tendency to an ochreous tint; - in ab. farkasii Tr. the forewing is more variegated, light and dark, the larger pale orbicular stigma and a pale patch obliquely below it forming a prominent streak; — indistincta Tutt has a uniform dull appearance, without speckling; — albifusa Walk. [now subspecies A. t. albifusa (Walker, 1857) Nova Scotia], described originally from a N. American specimen, but probably a rare general aberration, has occurred at Portland, on the chalky South coast of England: it is grey with a yellowish gloss, with a pale band as in farkasii, joined by a second pale oblique band from apex. - Larva varying from green to brown, thickly dark-dotted; dorsal line fine, pale, subdorsal lines broader, all black-edged; spiracular stripe broad, yellow varied with reddish.

Biology
One or two broods are produced each year, and adults can be seen at any time from May to September. This species flies at night and is attracted to light as well as to sugar and nectar-rich flowers.

Flight from June to first half of July. Second generation from latter half of July to September.

The larvae feed on a wide range of plants (see list below). The species overwinters as pupae.

Recorded food plants

Allium
Amaranthus – amaranth
Apium – celery
Arachis – peanut
Asparagus – asparagus
Atriplex
Beta – beet
Brassica
Cannabis
Chenopodium – goosefoot
Cytisus – broom
Glycine – soybean
Gossypium – cotton plant
Halogeton
Hibiscus
Lactuca – lettuce
Linum – flax
Lycopersicon – tomato
Medicago – alfalfa
Nicotiana – tobacco
Petroselinum – parsley
Phaseolus – common bean
Pisum
Populus – poplar
Portulaca – purslane
Raphanus – radish
Rheum – rhubarb
Ricinus – castor bean
Salsola
Scorzonera
Sonchus – sow-thistle
Spinacia – spinach
Taraxacum – dandelion
Trifolium – clover
Ulmus – elm

See reference.

References

Further reading
Chinery, Michael Collins Guide to the Insects of Britain and Western Europe 1986 (Reprinted 1991)
Skinner, Bernard Colour Identification Guide to Moths of the British Isles 1984

External links

Funet Taxonomy (as Hadula)
Lepiforum.de

Hadeninae
Moths described in 1766
Owlet moths of Africa
Moths of Asia
Moths of North America
Moths of Cape Verde
Moths of Europe
Moths of Japan
Moths of the Middle East
Taxa named by Johann Siegfried Hufnagel